Khak Sport Club, is an Iraqi football team based in Kirkuk, that plays in the Iraq Division Three and Kurdistan Premier League.

Managerial history
 Mudhaffer Nouri

See also 
 2020–21 Iraq FA Cup
 2021–22 Iraq FA Cup

References

External links
 Khak SC on Goalzz.com
 Iraq Clubs- Foundation Dates

1992 establishments in Iraq
Association football clubs established in 1992
Football clubs in Kirkuk